Opisthoteuthis chathamensis is a species of cirrate octopus restricted to demersal habitats surrounding the Chatham Rise in New Zealand. It is commonly known as the roughy umbrella octopus.

Distribution, description & threats

Specimens have been recorded solely on soft sediments from 900-1438 meters deep. The type locality of O. chathamensis is near the Chatham Islands at 44°44'S, 77°15'W, 1180 m. The species is known only from this area of the Chatham Rise and off the eastern coast of the North Island of New Zealand. O. chathamensis reaches a maximum length of 18 cm TL, and a mantle length of 5.4 cm. They are described as having subequal arms with around 41-45 suckers in males and 45-55 suckers in females. Their oral surface and the webbing between their tentacles is maroon and the suckers are a pale cream. O. chathamensis is listed as Critically Endangered by the IUCN due to a 70% decrease in population size in recent years, and has not been seen since 1999, when it was a common bycatch species. In addition, their longevity, low fecundity and slow growth (especially embryonic development which lasts 1.4-2.6 years among other species in the genus) has made them particularly susceptible to population declines and slow recoveries.

References

Cephalopods of Oceania
Endemic fauna of New Zealand
Endemic molluscs of New Zealand
Fauna of the Chatham Islands
Molluscs described in 1999
Molluscs of New Zealand
Molluscs of the Pacific Ocean
Octopuses